Buongiorno may refer to:

People
 Alessandro Buongiorno, Italian footballer
 Donatus Buongiorno, Italian painter
 Luca Buongiorno, Italian footballer
 Carlo Buongiorno, Italian aerospace engineer

Other
 Buongiorno (company), Italian company
 Buongiorno papà, 2013 Italian film
 Buongiorno, notte, 2003 Italian film
 Buongiorno, elefante!, 1952 Italian film
 Buongiorno Italia, Italian morning show